During World War II, the United States Army Air Forces (USAAF) established numerous airfields in Missouri for training pilots and aircrews of USAAF fighters and bombers.

Most of these airfields were under the command of First Air Force or the Army Air Forces Training Command (AAFTC) (A predecessor of the current-day United States Air Force Air Education and Training Command).  However the other USAAF support commands (Air Technical Service Command (ATSC); Air Transport Command (ATC) or Troop Carrier Command) commanded a significant number of airfields in a support roles.

It is still possible to find remnants of these wartime airfields. Many were converted into municipal airports, some were returned to agriculture and several were retained as United States Air Force installations and were front-line bases during the Cold War. Hundreds of the temporary buildings that were used survive today, and are being used for other purposes.

Major Airfields 
Army Air Force Training Command
 Chester Army Airfield, Perryville
 Contract flying training
 Now: Perryville Municipal Airport 

 Harris Army Airfield, Cape Girardeau
 Contract flying training
 Now: Cape Girardeau Regional Airport

 Harvey Parks Airport, Sikeston
 Contract flying training
 Now: Sikeston Memorial Municipal Airport

Troop Carrier Command
 Malden Army Airfield, Malden
 445th Army Air Force Base Unit
 Was: Malden Air Base (1951-1960)
 USAF Contract Flight Training
 Now: Malden Regional Airport 
 Sedalia Army Airfield, Knob Noster
 I Troop Carrier Command
 405th Army Air Force Base Unit
 Was: Sedalia Air Force Auxiliary Field (1948-1951)
 Was: Sedalia Air Force Base (1951-1955)
 Now:  Whiteman Air Force Base (1955-Pres)
 Vichy Army Airfield, Vichy
 Sub-base of Sedalia AAF
 Now: Rolla National Airport 
 Grandview Airport, Belton (1944-1945)
 Was: Grandview Air Force Base (1952-1957)
 Was: Richards-Gebaur Air Force Base {Active USAF control} (1957-1976)
 Was: Richards-Gebaur Air Force Base then Richards-Gebaur Air Reserve Station {AFRES/AFRC control} and Richards-Gebaur Memorial Airport (1976-1999)
 Closed 1999.  Now non-aviation use as Kansas City SmartPort.

 Forney Army Airfield, Fort Leonard Wood
 Support airfield for Ft. Leonard Wood
 Now: Waynesville Regional Airport at Forney Field

Air Technical Service Command
 Lambert Field, St. Louis
 Joint use USAAF/US Navy/Civil Airport
 Now: Lambert-St. Louis International Airport

Air Transport Command
 Rosencrans Field Army Airfield, St. Joseph
 406th Army Air Force Base Unit
 Now:  Rosecrans Air National Guard Base
 Kansas City Apt, Kansas City
 Joint use USAAF/Civil Airport
 Now: Charles B. Wheeler Downtown Airport

References
 Maurer, Maurer (1983). Air Force Combat Units Of World War II. Maxwell AFB, Alabama: Office of Air Force History. .
 Ravenstein, Charles A. (1984). Air Force Combat Wings Lineage and Honors Histories 1947-1977. Maxwell AFB, Alabama: Office of Air Force History. .
 Thole, Lou (1999), Forgotten Fields of America : World War II Bases and Training, Then and Now - Vol. 2.  Pictorial Histories Pub . 
 Military Airfields in World War II - Missouri

External links

 
World War II
Airfields of the United States Army Air Forces in the United States by state
United States World War II army airfields